Har Do Rud or Hardow Rud or Hardo Rud may refer to:
 Har Do Rud, Nur
 Hardow Rud, Qaem Shahr